Robert Rucker may refer to:

 Robert D. Rucker (born 1952), justice on the Indiana Supreme Court
 Robert M. Rucker (born 1967), American jazz drummer, music teacher and composer
 Robert Malcolm Rucker (1932–2001), American impressionistic artist